The Treaties of Balta Liman may refer to:

 Treaty of Balta Liman
 Anglo-Ottoman Treaty